Mantra marga is one of the two main sects of Shaivism while the other one is being "Atimarga". Although it is believed that Atimarga precedes Mantramarga, there are so many contemporary evidences available for both sects. Mantra marga became  more popular than ATI marga in its nature which focuses on social and worldwide  temporal philosophy.

History
The term Mantra marga means the entire Tantric paradigm of ritual worship and meditation. Clear evidences say that Mantra marga became popular in the end of the 6th century CE. South Indian Agamas are believed to be composed no later than 5th century CE. "Nisvasa" series of Agamas has been composed initially in the Mantra margic treatise between 450 - 500 CE.

Mantra margic texts describe the construction of temples, ruling of the countries in Shaivite supervising, and social and spiritual responsibility in Shaivite perspectives. They swear reciting mantras can be used to control the thread of enemies and natural catastrophes. Mantra marga spread vigorously until the 11th century CE and cause the establishment of great empires even in south-east Asia such as Anghor and Majapahit.

Mantra marga schools
Mantra marga is classified into two schools, Saiddhantika and  Non - saiddhantika respectively.  Saiddhantika sect is South Indian Tamil Siddhantism. It praises Sadasiva as its supreme deity. Kirana, Kalottara and Mrigendra are the few agamas that emerged from North India though several sivagamas including Karana, Kamika has been produced in South land.  The ritual for royal coronation explained in the siddhantic agamas indicate  their significance among kings.   

Non - saiddhantika is a group of many sects worshiping Bhairava as their supreme deity. These sects are mostly identified today with Kashmir Shaivism. Researchers assume with the liturgical testimonies  that the Shaktism could be  developed from Non - saiddhantic mantra marga. Following list gives a brief introduction on Non - saiddhantika schools of Mantra margic Shaivism.

 Vama = Tumburu and his four sisters (Jaya, Vijaya, Ajita, Aparajita) are supreme.   
 Dakshina = Svacchanda Bhairava and Aghoreshwari.  
 Yamala = Kapalesa Bhairava and chandakapalini.
 Netra = Amruteshwara and Amruteshwari
 Trika = matrsadbhava and three goddesses -  Para, Apara, Parapa
 Kubjika = Kubjika and Navatma Bhairava
 Kalikula =  Kalasankarshini
 Shrikula = Lalita

Sinchini Tantra explains that the last four sects are Shaktist branches. But Kubjika and Trika are considered as Shaivite sects nowadays.

References

External links

Shaiva sects